Kings of Devon is a 2010 Bengali language dark comedy film written, produced, and directed by Rahsaan Noor. Noor also stars in the film, which was made for charity. It was released in the United States on 17 September 2010.

Plot 
In 1982, Bengali people ruled the streets of Chicago. Arif Choudhury comes to Chicago at the request of his uncle but gets caught in the middle of a bitter rivalry between the two biggest gangs in the Devon area of the city, Apon Desh and BD-Chicago. Accused of murder and on the run from the authorities, Arif befriends Johnny - who pledges to help Arif and get revenge on Sikander Saab. Did Arif commit murder or is he being framed? Will they get revenge on Sikander Saab? Who will climb the mountain and become the king of Devon...?

Cast 
 Rahsaan Noor as Johnny
 Bakhtiar Hafeez as Sikandar Saab
 Tamim Chowdhury as Arif Chowdhury
 Trishna Murad as Tasfia

Release 
Kings of Devon was released throughout the United States in association with BIG Cinemas. The film also featured music from The Times Group and Sa Re Ga Ma. The film ran successfully in various cities throughout the United States.  Islam was interviewed on Channel i through the lead-up to the release of the film.

Charitable cause 
The box office revenues from Kings of Devon went to raise money for Shishu Bikash Kendra, a school for underprivileged children in the Dhanmondi district of Dhaka, Bangladesh. Home media DVDs were also made available to raise money for the charity. Shishu Bikash Kendra is a part of Zonta International.

Soundtrack 
The soundtrack of Kings of Devon was licensed from Times Music and Sa Re Ga Ma HMV.

Notes

External links 
 Kings of Devon at Internet Movie Database

2010 films
2010 black comedy films
Bengali-language Indian films
Indian black comedy films